On November 17, 2019, a mass shooting occurred at a Fresno, California football watch party with 35 to 40 people present, including several children. Four people were killed and six were injured. It was the third mass shooting in California in less than a week, the others being the 2019 Saugus High School shooting that killed three and injured another three in Santa Clarita, and a family murder–suicide in San Diego that killed five and injured one.

Incident 
The shooting happened in a backyard of a home when a group of friends and families were holding a football watch party, to watch the game between the Los Angeles Rams and the Chicago Bears. The party was composed of about 35 to 40 friends and family members of the home owner in attendance. At some point during the party the women and children attending the party had moved inside to watch TV, while 16 men stayed outside to continue watching the football game. At least two suspects snuck through an unlocked gate of the home around 6:00 pm PST and opened fire indiscriminately before they fled on foot.

Victims
The deceased victims were all men between the ages of 23 and 40 years old.  Three men were pronounced dead at the scene while another was transported to Community Regional Medical Center where he died of his injuries. Two of the deceased were well-known Southeast Asian singers.

Five others were treated with non-life threatening wounds at the same hospital while another was treated at a different hospital.  The surviving victims are men between the ages of 28 and 36. All of the victims are members of the Hmong community in Fresno. The Fresno area is home to the largest Hmong population in California and the second-largest in the United States. Their community expressed sadness and bewilderment.

Investigation
The Fresno Police Department is investigating the incident, with assistance from the U.S. Bureau of Alcohol, Tobacco, Firearms and Explosives and Clovis Police Department. Fresno Police Deputy Chief Michael Reed said the victims were "likely targeted". The department mobilized an "Asian Gang Task Force" to look into concerns about the attack being connected to a recent spike in violent crime by Asian gangs.

On December 31, six suspects were arrested in connection with the shooting, all of whom were believed to have been members of the Mongolian Boys Society gang. One of the victims was a former member of the rival gang Asian Crips. The shooting was allegedly retaliation for the murder of a Mongolian Boys Society member by a member of the Asian Crips. The suspects were detained at the Fresno County Jail and faced four counts of homicide, 12 counts of attempted homicide, and conspiracy to commit murder with gang and firearms enhancements. In February 2020, a seventh suspect was arrested and charged with the same offenses.

See also
 List of homicides in California
 List of mass shootings in the United States in 2019
 Orinda shooting
 Mass shootings in the United States
 List of mass shootings in the United States

References 

2019 crimes in California
2019 mass shootings in the United States
2019 shooting
Asian-American gangs
Deaths by firearm in California
Hmong-American culture in California
Mass shootings in California
Mass shootings in the United States
November 2019 crimes in North America
November 2019 events in the United States